Donald Grant Devine, SOM (born July 5, 1944) is a Canadian politician who served as the 11th premier of Saskatchewan from 1982 to 1991. He was the last Saskatchewan premier from the Progressive Conservative Party.

Early life 

Born in Regina, Saskatchewan on July 5, 1944, Devine was raised on his grandfather's farm near Lake Valley. He received a BSc degree in Agriculture in 1967 from the University of Saskatchewan, a master's degree in Agricultural Economics in 1970 from the University of Alberta, and a PhD in Agricultural Economics from Ohio State University in 1976. Devine then taught agricultural marketing and consumer economics at the University of Saskatchewan from 1976 to 1979.

Entry into politics 

Although he was defeated in the riding of Saskatoon Nutana in the 1978 provincial election, Devine was elected leader of the Progressive Conservative Party in November 1979. He lost a 1980 by-election in Estevan in a three-way split in which each party received more than 27 percent of the vote.

Devine led the Progressive Conservatives in the 1982 election against the governing New Democratic Party led by Premier Allan Blakeney. Devine campaigned on eliminating the gas tax and guaranteeing home mortgage rates at 13.25 percent. Devine was also aided by the NDP's vulnerability, as interest rates under the eleven-year-old Blakeney government were at 18 percent. The election result on April 26 showed the Progressive Conservatives had won a landslide victory, winning 55 out of 64 seats (with Devine winning Estevan) and 54.1 percent of the popular vote. Devine became the second and last Progressive Conservative premier in Saskatchewan history, after James Thomas Milton Anderson who was premier from 1929 to 1934.

Premier of Saskatchewan (1982–1991)

Economic policy 

One of Devine's first actions as premier was to organize an "Open for Business" conference in October 1982 to emphasize that free enterprise and private investment were welcome in Saskatchewan and the fact that the "socialist" era in the province was over (as the social democratic Co-operative Commonwealth Federation had governed the province for the previous 31 out of 38 years).

Devine's government introduced a three-year royalty holiday for new oil wells and cut royalties for existing ones. This led to a significant increase in drilling, though the government experienced lower revenues.

Devine's government privatized crown corporations including Saskatchewan Minerals worth $15 million and the Potash Corporation worth over $1 billion.

When the Devine government took office in 1982, the provincial budget was balanced. The Devine government ran consecutive deficit budgets (and the deficit peaked in fiscal year 1986–1987 at $1.2 billion) as a result of their policies of tax cuts, tax rebates, mortgage subsidies, drastic increases in election spending, and multi-million dollar investments in several money-losing megaprojects. During Devine's premiership, Saskatchewan's debt grew from $3.5 billion to $15 billion in fiscal year 1991–1992; by this time, annual interest payments had exceeded $500 million and were the third-largest component in the budget after health and education.

The year Devine came to government the provincial GDP only grew 0.6 per cent, down from 20.9 per cent growth the previous year.

Agricultural policy 

Devine opposed government ownership of land, and in 1982, his government abolished the Land Bank (which was established by the NDP government in 1974 and sought to aid the intergenerational transfer of farmland), replacing it with 8 percent loans to allow farmers to buy their own land. The main reason for the Land Bank's end was the fact that it led to a large amount of land being acquired by the government.

In 1989, Devine's government began to subsidize crop revenues by introducing the Net Income Stabilization Account and the Gross Revenue Insurance Program; this marked the start of the province directly supporting crop farm incomes.

Fraud scandal 

Although Devine himself was never implicated in any criminal wrongdoing, 13 Conservative MLAs and staffers were subsequently charged with expense account fraud committed during Devine's second term (1986–1991). The scheme accounted for $837,000 of defrauded government funds. Of these a handful were acquitted while some served prison time.

1986 re-election 

With the help of the rural vote, Devine's Progressive Conservatives were re-elected in the 1986 election with a greatly reduced majority. He was the only premier of the Conservative/Progressive Conservative Party to win re-election in Saskatchewan. The NDP won a plurality of the popular vote.

1991 defeat 

After two terms in power, Devine's Progressive Conservatives suffered a landslide defeat in the 1991 election by the New Democratic Party led by Roy Romanow. The PC party won 25.5% of the popular vote and was reduced to 10 seats in the legislature. The party would never return to power again.  A major source of dissatisfaction with the Devine government was the "Fair Share Saskatchewan" program, a scheme to distribute public service jobs more evenly across the province; this plan was especially unpopular with workers scheduled to be relocated from Regina to rural districts. Privatizations, cuts to social programs, and the drastic increase in provincial debt also contributed to Devine's unpopularity.

After politics 

On October 8, 1992, Devine announced his resignation as Progressive Conservative leader, effective December 31, 1992.

In 2004, Devine announced his intention to return to politics and run for the federal Conservative Party of Canada, but the party ruled he was an undesirable candidate, and denied him the right to seek a nomination. Despite the ruling, Devine continued to enjoy the public support of Conservative deputy leader Peter MacKay. On May 7, Devine announced that he would run as an independent candidate in the 2004 federal election for the riding of Souris—Moose Mountain. Consequently, Devine was expelled from the Conservative Party on June 8 by the party's executive council. Devine finished the election second to Conservative Ed Komarnicki. Devine received 8,399 votes (29.42% of the popular vote).

Since 2017, Devine has served on the University of Saskatchewan's board of governors.

Partial electoral record

Honours 

On October 2, 2009, it was announced that Devine would be appointed to the honour of the Saskatchewan Order of Merit, for his contributions to the Province of Saskatchewan. He received the honour on November 17, 2009.

Notes 

1944 births
Living people
Ohio State University College of Food, Agricultural, and Environmental Sciences alumni
Politicians from Regina, Saskatchewan
Premiers of Saskatchewan
University of Alberta alumni
University of Saskatchewan alumni
Academic staff of the University of Saskatchewan
Progressive Conservative Party of Saskatchewan MLAs
Saskatchewan candidates for Member of Parliament
Saskatchewan political party leaders
Members of the Saskatchewan Order of Merit
Members of the Executive Council of Saskatchewan